Saint John’s Preparatory School (SJP) is a Catholic co-educational, day and boarding college preparatory school located in Collegeville, Minnesota. Founded in 1857, it is located in the Diocese of Saint Cloud and is administered by the Benedictine monks of Saint John's Abbey. The school includes a middle school consisting of grades 6–8 and an upper school consisting of grades 9–12. The student body consists of students from the local area along with 5- and 7-day boarding students from across the United States and around the world. In the 2018–19 academic year, the student body included students from 24 different cities and towns in Minnesota, 4 states and 13 different countries.

Background

Saint John's Preparatory School was established in 1857 by the monks of Saint John's Abbey, a Benedictine monastery located in Collegeville, MN. SJP is the oldest secondary school in Minnesota. It was all-male until 1972 when the nearby all-girls school, St. Benedict's Academy owned and operated by the Sisters of St. Benedict's Monastery in St. Joseph, MN closed. The college sections of both schools are still in operation and run as partnered liberal arts institutions.

Today the school has an almost equal number of boys and girls. In 2011, 75% of the students at SJP were from the St. Cloud, Minnesota area, with the remaining 25% coming from out of state and worldwide. The 2013-2014 student body has representation from 17 countries.  The Middle School opened in 1997, with 21 7th and 8th-grade students in a combined classroom setting. Since then the Middle School has nearly tripled in size and with high interest from area families, SJP added a 6th-grade program in 2009.

Saint John's Prep has been named an International Baccalaureate World School and has been approved to offer the IB Diploma Programme starting Fall 2011 with the first class graduating with the IB Diploma in 2013.

The current Head of School is Jon McGee, succeeding the long-time headmaster, Father Jonathan Licari, O.S.B.

Academics
Saint John's Prep is a college preparatory school with studies in the fine arts, language arts, and sciences.
Listed among the top 20 boarding schools (out of 307 schools) for: Student Test Scores - High average SAT scores.

College classes
Saint John's Prep shares its  campus with Saint John's University, a small, liberal arts university, which is affiliated with the nearby College of Saint Benedict. Each semester, 10-20 students take at least one college class at SJU or CSB.

Exchange programs
Saint John's Prep offers a year-long study abroad opportunity with the Benedictine Gymnasium in Melk, Austria.

Athletic facilities 
Prep uses several athletic facilities on the SJU campus, including Clemens Stadium  the current home of the Track and Field team, with a 400m track and a separate location for shot-put and discus. The Natural Bowl is also the former home of the Football team. (Football has recently been co-oped with St. Cloud Technical Senior School.)

Notable alumni 
 Mathew Ahmann  civil rights activist
 David Durenberger  American politician and former Republican member of the U.S. Senate
 Eugene McCarthy  American politician, poet, and longtime member of the United States Congress
 George Sinner  former governor of North Dakota and Vice President of American Crystal Sugar
 Peter Strzok  former FBI agent

External links
 School Website
 Saint John's University Archives Presentation on Life at the Prep School created by the University Archivist, Peggy Roske, 2011.
 Saint John's University Archives Presentation on the First Headmasters of the Prep School created by the University Archivist, Peggy Roske, 2012.
 http://www.boardingschoolreview.com/school_overview.php

Notes and references

Roman Catholic Diocese of Saint Cloud
Catholic secondary schools in Minnesota
Schools in Stearns County, Minnesota
Educational institutions established in 1857
Private middle schools in Minnesota
International Baccalaureate schools in Minnesota
Benedictine secondary schools
Boarding schools in Minnesota
Catholic boarding schools in the United States
1857 establishments in Minnesota Territory